Babelomurex japonicus, common name the Japanese latiaxis, is a species of sea snail, a marine gastropod mollusc in the family Muricidae, the murex snails or rock snails.

Description
The length of the shell varies between 25 mm and 50 mm.

Distribution
This marine species is found in the following countries, Japan, the Philippines and Hawaii.

References

 Liu, J.Y. [Ruiyu] (ed.). (2008). Checklist of marine biota of China seas. China Science Press. 1267 pp
 Oliverio M. (2008) Coralliophilinae (Neogastropoda: Muricidae) from the southwest Pacific. In: V. Héros, R.H. Cowie & P. Bouchet (eds), Tropical Deep-Sea Benthos 25. Mémoires du Muséum National d'Histoire Naturelle 196: 481–585. page(s): 523 
 Kilburn R.N., Marais J.P. & Marais A.P. (2010) Coralliophilinae. pp. 272–292, in: Marais A.P. & Seccombe A.D. (eds), Identification guide to the seashells of South Africa. Volume 1. Groenkloof: Centre for Molluscan Studies. 376 pp.
 Severns M. (2011) Shells of the Hawaiian Islands - The Sea Shells. Conchbooks, Hackenheim. 564 pp.

External links
 
 Jousseaume F. (1883). Description d'espèces et genres nouveaux de mollusques. Bulletin de la Société Zoologique de France. 8: 186-204, pl. 10

japonicus
Gastropods described in 1882